The 1912 Epsom by-election was held on 21 March 1912.  The by-election was held due to the death of the incumbent Conservative MP, William Keswick.  It was won by his son the Conservative candidate Henry Keswick, who was unopposed.

References

1912 elections in the United Kingdom
1912 in England
20th century in Surrey
Epsom and Ewell
By-elections to the Parliament of the United Kingdom in Surrey constituencies
Unopposed by-elections to the Parliament of the United Kingdom (need citation)